Jerzy "George" B. Zubrzycki AO CBE MBE (Military) (12 January 192020 May 2009) was a Polish-born Australian sociologist, widely regarded as the "Father of Australian Multiculturalism".

He was born in Kraków, Poland.  He escaped from Nazi rule in World War II, and joined the Free Polish forces in the United Kingdom.  For his services there he was made a Member of the Order of the British Empire (Military Division) by the UK Government.

In 1956 he was appointed to a post at the Australian National University in Canberra, Australia, where he remained for the rest of his life.

He chaired the Australian Ethnic Affairs Council 1977–81, served on the council of the Institute of Multicultural Affairs 1980–86, and on the interim council of the National Museum of Australia.  He travelled widely with members of the Fraser Government to help explain their multiculturalism policies.

He was a member of the Pontifical Academy of Social Sciences, and he was also honoured by Poland and the United States.

He died in Canberra on 20 May 2009, aged 89.

Honours
In 1967 Zubrzycki was elected Fellow of the Academy of the Social Sciences in Australia. For his work promoting multiculturalism in Australia, Zubrzycki was appointed a Commander of the Order of the British Empire (CBE) in 1978, and an Officer of the Order of Australia (AO) in 1984.

Bibliography

Notes

External links
 Biographical note at National Library of Australia

1920 births
2009 deaths
Australian sociologists
Australian Commanders of the Order of the British Empire
Australian Members of the Order of the British Empire
Officers of the Order of Australia
Members of the Pontifical Academy of Social Sciences
Polish emigrants to Australia
Quadrant (magazine) people
People associated with the magazine "Kultura"